Richard Edward Vernon (28 December 1878 – 18 January 1954) was an Australian rules footballer who played for Collingwood in the Victorian Football League (VFL).

Vernon joined Collingwood from Boulder City in the Goldfields Football Association, which he captained in 1906 and played as a rover. He participated in finals at Collingwood in each of his three seasons and was a half forward flanker in their 1910 premiership team. Vernon also played in the losing 1911 Grand Final side.

In 1912, the season after he retired, Vernon umpired four VFL matches during the year as a field umpire.

References

Holmesby, Russell and Main, Jim (2007). The Encyclopedia of AFL Footballers. 7th ed. Melbourne: Bas Publishing.

External links

Dick Vernon's umpiring statistics from AFL Tables

1878 births
Australian rules footballers from Western Australia
Collingwood Football Club players
Collingwood Football Club Premiership players
Australian Football League umpires
Boulder City Football Club players
1954 deaths
One-time VFL/AFL Premiership players